Bazeh (also Romanized as Bāzeh; also known as Baiza, Beyzā, and Bezā) is a village in Bizaki Rural District, Golbajar District, Chenaran County, Razavi Khorasan Province, Iran. At the 2006 census, its population was 113, in 27 families.

References 

Populated places in Chenaran County